Ribulose 5-phosphate is one of the end-products of the pentose phosphate pathway. It is also an intermediate in the Calvin cycle.

It is formed by phosphogluconate dehydrogenase, and it can be acted upon by phosphopentose isomerase and phosphopentose epimerase.

In plants, Ribulose 5-phosphate produced from the pentose-phosphate pathway is converted into Ribulose-1-5-bisphosphate by the enzyme phosphoribokinase.

See also
 Ribulose
 Ribulose-1,5-bisphosphate

Organophosphates
Monosaccharide derivatives